Trevor Roy Dunn (born January 30, 1968) is an American composer, bass guitarist, and double bassist. He came to prominence in the 1990s with the experimental band Mr. Bungle.  While performing with Mr. Bungle, Dunn would dress similar to the St. Pauli Girl.  He has since worked in an array of musical styles, including with saxophonist/composer John Zorn, Secret Chiefs 3 and with his own avant-garde jazz/rock ensemble Trevor Dunn's Trio-Convulsant. He is also a member of the band Tomahawk.

Biography

Early life and career
After four years of studying the clarinet, Dunn began playing electric bass at the age of 13. His earliest musical influences included the Beach Boys, Blondie, Cheap Trick, and Kiss.

Trevor Dunn's Trio-Convulsant
In 1998, Dunn formed his Trio-Convulsant. Their first release, Debutantes & Centipedes, features Dunn on bass, Adam Levy on guitar, and Kenny Wollesen on drums. The album Sister Phantom Owl Fish on Ipecac (2004) includes Ches Smith on percussion and Mary Halvorson on guitar.

Other works

Dunn has participated in dozens of other recordings, both as a main collaborator and a guest musician. He is part of Mike Pride's MPThree, David Krakauer's Klezmer Madness, and the Nels Cline Singers. He has contributed to or played with: Afro-Mystic, Ben Goldberg, Brian "Head" Welch, Graham Connah's Sour Note Seven, Jess Jones Quartet, Junk Genius, Laplante/Dunn/Smith, John Zorn's Electric Masada, Matisyahu, Rova Saxophone Quartet, Sean Lennon, Suit of Lights, Rob Price Quartet, Tin Hat Trio, and Tipsy.

Bass guitars
1975 Fender P-Bass (his primary electric bass tuned to B-E-A-D for Fantômas)
1950's Czech Contrabass used with Trevor Dunn's Trio-Convulsant, occasionally with Mr. Bungle and with King Buzzo
1991 Alembic 5-string Europa
Ken Lawrence 5-string fretless
Guild Ashbory
1966 Guild Starfire

Discography

As leader or co-leader
 1996 Phillip Greenlief/Trevor Dunn with Phillip Greenlief (Evander)
 1999 Debutantes & Centipedes (Buzz)
 2004 Sister Phantom Owl Fish (Ipecac)
 2005 untitled with Shelley Burgon (self-released)
 2005 At Blim with Shelley Burgon (Audiobot)
 2007 Baltimore  with Shelley Burgon (Skirl)
 2008 Four Films (Tzadik)
 2008 White with Foam (Ipecac)
 2016 Strength & Power with Roswell Rudd, Jamie Saft, and Balázs Pándi (RareNoiseRecords)
 2019 Nocturnes (Tzadik)

As band member
With Mr. Bungle
1991 − Mr. Bungle (Warner Bros.)
1995 − Disco Volante (Warner Bros.)
1999 − California (Warner Bros.)
2020 − The Raging Wrath of the Easter Bunny Demo (Ipecac)

With Secret Chiefs 3
1996 − First Grand Constitution and Bylaws

With Fantômas
1999 − Fantômas
2001 − The Director's Cut
2002 − Millennium Monsterwork 2000 (by The Fantômas Melvins Big Band)
2004 − Delìrium Còrdia
2005 − Suspended Animation
2008 − Live from London 2006 DVD (by The Fantômas Melvins Big Band)
With Melvins (Lite)
2006 − A Live History of Gluttony and Lust (electric bass for this album, double bass for all subsequent releases)
2012 − Freak Puke
2013 – Everybody Loves Sausages (on three songs, also sings on "Timothy Leary Lives")
2016 – Basses Loaded (on "Planet Destructo")

With The Nels Cline Singers
Macroscope (Mack Avenue, 2014)

With Tomahawk
2013 − Oddfellows
2021 – Tonic Immobility

As sideman
With Erik Friedlander
Grains of Paradise (Tzadik, 2001)
Broken Arm Trio (Skipstone, 2008)
50 Miniatures for Improvising Quintet (Skipstone, 2010)
Bonebridge (Skipstone, 2011)
Nighthawks (Skipstone, 2014)
Oscalypso (Skipstone, 2015)

With Eyvind Kang
The Narrow Garden (Ipecac, 2012)

With Jamie Saft
2009 – Black Shabbis

With John Zorn
2000 − The Big Gundown – 15th Anniversary Special Edition
2001 − The Gift
2002 − Cobra: John Zorn's Game Pieces Volume 2
2002 − Filmworks XII: Three Documentaries
2002 − Filmworks XIII: Invitation to a Suicide
2003 − Filmworks XIV: Hiding and Seeking
2004 − 50th Birthday Celebration Volume 4 with Electric Masada
2005 − Electric Masada: At the Mountains of Madness with Electric Masada
2005 − Filmworks Anthology – 20 Years of Soundtrack Music
2006 − Moonchild: Songs Without Words with Moonchild
2006 − Astronome with Moonchild
2007 − Six Litanies for Heliogabalus with Moonchild
2007 − Asmodeus: Book of Angels Volume 7 with Marc Ribot
2008 − The Dreamers with The Dreamers
2008 − The Crucible with Moonchild
2009 − O'o with The Dreamers
2010 − Ipos: Book of Angels Volume 14 with The Dreamers
2010 − Ipsissimus with Moonchild
2010 − Interzone
2010 − Filmworks XXIV: The Nobel Prizewinner
2010 − The Goddess – Music for the Ancient of Days
2011 − Nova Express with the Nova Quartet
2011 − At the Gates of Paradise
2011 − A Dreamers Christmas with The Dreamers
2012 − Templars: In Sacred Blood with Moonchild
2012 − Enigmata
2012 − Rimbaud
2012 − A Vision in Blakelight
2012 − The Concealed
2013 − Dreamachines with the Nova Quartet
2014 – On Leaves of Grass with the Nova Quartet
2014 – Valentine's Day
2014 − The Last Judgment
2015 – Pellucidar: A Dreamers Fantabula with The Dreamers
2015 − The True Discoveries of Witches and Demons
2015 − The Song Project Live at Le Poisson Rouge
2017 − The Garden of Earthly Delights
2018 − Insurrection
2018 − Salem, 1692
2019 − The Hierophant
2020 – Calculus

With Jozef Dumoulin Trio
2011 − Rainbow Body with Jozef Dumoulin (Rhodes) and Eric Thielemans (drums)

With the Rob Price Quartet
2004 − At Sunset with Ellery Eskelin and Joey Baron
2007 − I Really Do Not See the Signal with Jim Black replacing Baron

With King Buzzo
2020 − Gift of Sacrifice (Ipecac)

Album collaborations
1999 − PantyChrist by Bob Ostertag, Justin Bond and Otomo Yoshihide
2004 − Eucademix by Yuka Honda

Guest appearances
1994 − Dressing for Pleasure by Jon Hassell & Bluescreen (on the songs "Villa Narco" and "Mati")
1996 − In These Great Times by John Schott
1996 − Trip Tease by Tipsy
1999 − Memory Is an Elephant by Tin Hat Trio
2000 − Helium by Tin Hat Trio
2002 − The Rabbi's Lover by Jenny Scheinman
2003 − Dimly Lit: Collected Soundtracks 1996–2002 by Doug Wieselman
2004 − Eucademix by Yuka Honda
2004 − Shalagaster by Jenny Scheinman
2005 − Nihm by Okkyung Lee
2006 − Starling by Billy Martin
2008 − Save Me from Myself by Head
2008 − Terror Syndrome by Terror Syndrome
2009 − Blackbird's Echo by Niobe

References

External links
 Official site
 Interview

1968 births
20th-century American bass guitarists
American experimental musicians
American rock bass guitarists
American male bass guitarists
American rock double-bassists
Male double-bassists
Avant-garde jazz musicians
Guitarists from California
Living people
People from Eureka, California
Singers from California
Tzadik Records artists
Fantômas (band) members
Melvins members
Mr. Bungle members
Tomahawk (band) members
21st-century double-bassists
20th-century American male musicians
21st-century American male musicians
American male jazz musicians
Trevor Dunn's Trio-Convulsant members
The Nels Cline Singers members